

Sovereign states

A
Aboh – Aboh Kingdom
 Abkhazia – Principality of Abkhazia
 Abu `Arish – Abu `Arish Sheikhdom
 Aceh – Aceh Sultanate
Adrar – Emirate of Adrar
 Afghanistan – Durrani Empire
 Ahom – Ahom Kingdom
Aïr – Terene Sultanate of Aïr
 Ajman – Emirate of Ajman
Akure – Akure Kingdom
Akyem – Akyem Confederacy
Amarro – Amarro Kingdom
Ambohidratrimo – Ambohidratrimo Kingdom
 Andorra – Principality of Andorra
Anrindrano – Anrindrano Kingdom
Angoche – Angoche Sultanate
 Antankarana – Antankarana Kingdom
Anziku – Anziku Kingdom
 Arakkal – Arakkal Kingdom
Arcot – Nawabs of the Carnatic
Ardabil – Ardabil Khanate
 Aro – Aro Confederacy
 Asahan – Sultanate of Asahan
 Ashanti – Kingdom of Ashanti
Aulaqi – Aulaqi Sultanate
 Aussa – Sultanate of Aussa
 Avar – Avar Khanate
 Ayutthaya – Kingdom of Ayutthaya
Ayayna – Ayayna Sheikhdom

B
Badakhshan – Badakhshan Khanate
Bagirmi – Sultanate of Bagirmi
Baku – Baku Khanate
Bali – Kingdom of Bali
Baltistan
Bamana – Bamana Empire
Bambao – Sultanate of Bambao
Bamum – Kingdom of Bamum
Bani Khalid
Banjar – Sultanate of Banjar
Baol – Kingdom of Baol
Bara – Bara Kingdom
Barotseland – Kingdom of Barotseland
Barwani – Barwani State
Beihan – Emirate of Beihan
 Bengal – Principality of Bengal
Benin – Kingdom of Benin
Bhaktapur – Kingdom of Bhaktapur
Bhutan – Kingdom of Bhutan
Bida – Bida Emirate
Bidache – Principality of Bidache
 Bikaner – Bikaner State
Bima – Sultanate of Bima
Biu – Biu Kingdom
Boina – Boina Kingdom
Bonny – Kingdom of Bonny
Bonoman
Bornu – Bornu Empire
Brakna – Emirate of Brakna
 Brunei – Bruneian Empire
Buganda – Kingdom of Buganda
 Bukhara – Khanate of Bukhara
Bulungan – Sultanate of Bulungan
Bundi – Bundi State
Bundu
Bunyoro – Bunyoro-Kitara Kingdom
Burma – Kingdom of Burma
Burundi – Kingdom of Burundi
Butuan – Rajahnate of Butuan
Buzaaya – Buzaaya Chiefdom

C
Calicut – Zamorin of Calicut
 Cambodia – Kingdom of Cambodia
Cayor – Kingdom of Cayor
Chamba – Chamba State
 Champasak – Kingdom of Champasak
China – Empire of the Great Qing
Chitral – State of Chitral
Circassia
Comancheria – Nʉmʉnʉʉ Sookobitʉ
Cooch Behar – Cooch Behar State
Coorg – Kingdom of Coorg
 Cospaia – Republic of Cospaia
Cutch – Cutch State

D
Dahomey – Kingdom of Dahomey
Đại Việt – Kingdom of Đại Việt
Damagaram – Sultanate of Damagaram
Daniski
Darfur – Sultanate of Darfur
Dassa – Dassa Kingdom
Dathina – Dathina Sheikhdom
Daura – Daura Emirate
Dauro – Dauro Kingdom
Dendi – Dendi Kingdom
 Denmark-Norway – Kingdom of Denmark-Norway
Derbent – Derbent Khanate
Dhala – Emirate of Dhala
Didoya
 Diriyah – Emirate of Diriyah
Dosso – Dosso Kingdom
Durdzuketia
Dutse – Kingdom of Dutse
Dzungar – Dzungar Khanate

E
Elisu – Elisu Sultanate
Erivan – Erivan Khanate
Ethiopia – Ethiopian Empire

F
Fadhli – Fadhli Sultanate
Fezzan – Fezzan Sultanate
Fisakana – Fisakana Kingdom
Fosdinovo – Marquisate of Fosdinovo
 France – Kingdom of France
 Futa Djallon – Imamate of Futa Djallon

G
Ganja – Ganja Khanate
 Garhwal – Garhwal Kingdom
Garo – Kingdom of Garo
Gazikumukh – Gazikumukh Khanate
Geledi – Sultanate of the Geledi
 Genoa – Republic of Genoa
Gliji
Gobir
 Gorkha – Kingdom of Gorkha
Grand-Bassam – Grand-Bassam Kingdom
 Great Britain – Kingdom of Great Britain
Great Fulo – Empire of Great Fulo
Gumel – Gumel Emirate

H
 Habsburg monarchy
Hadimu – Kingdom of Hadimu
Hamahame – Sultanate of Hamahame
Hamamvu – Sultanate of Hamamvu
Hambuu – Sultanate of Hambuu
Hanthawaddy – Hanthawaddy Kingdom
Harar – Emirate of Harar
Hausa Kingdoms
Haushabi – Hawshabi Sultanate of Musaymir
Herat – Emirate of Herat
 Holy Roman Empire – Holy Roman Empire of the German Nation
Hunza
 Hyderabad – Hyderabad State

I
Idoani – Idoani Confederacy
Igala – Igala Kingdom
Igbirra
Ijebu – Ijebu Kingdom
Ilé-Ifẹ̀ – Ilé-Ifẹ̀ Kingdom
 Imerina – Kingdom of Imerina
Isandra – Isandra Kingdom
Isedo – Isedo Kingdom
Itsandra – Sultanate of Itsandra
Iwo – Iwo Kingdom

J
Jafarabad – Jafarabad State
Jaintia – Jaintia Kingdom
 Jaipur – Kingdom of Jaipur
Jaisalmer – Kingdom of Jaisalmer
 Jambi – Sultanate of Jambi
Janjero – Kingdom of Janjero
Janjira – Janjira State
Japan – Tokugawa Shogunate
Javad – Javad Khanate
 Johor – Johor Sultanate
Jolof – Kingdom of Jolof
Joseon – Kingdom of Great Joseon

K
Kaabu – Kaabu Empire
Kabardia – Principality of Kabardia
Kabasarana
Kachari – Kachari Kingdom
Kaffa – Kingdom of Kaffa
Kafiristan
 Kakheti – Kingdom of Kakheti
Kakongo – Kingdom of Kakongo
Kalabari – Kalabari Kingdom
 Kalat – Khanate of Kalat
Kandy – Kingdom of Kandy
Kangra – Kangra State
Kano – Sultanate of Kano
Kantipur – Kingdom of Kantipur
Karabakh – Karabakh Khanate
Karadagh – Karadagh Khanate
Karagwe – Kingdom of Karagwe
 Kartli – Kingdom of Kartli
Kasanje – Kasanje Kingdom
Kathiri – Kathiri State of Seiyun in Hadhramaut
Katsina – Katsina Emirate
Kaytak – Principality of Kaytak
Kazakh – Kazakh Khanate
Kazembe – Kingdom of Kazembe
Kebbi – Kebbi Emirate
Keladi – Keladi Nayaka Kingdom
Kénédougou – Kénédougou Kingdom
Ketu
Khalkhal – Khalkhal Khanate
Kharan – State of Kharan
Khardj – Khardj Emirate
Khasso – Kingdom of Khasso
Khiva – Khanate of Khiva
Khoy – Khoy Khanate
Kilwa – Kilwa Sultanate
Kirtipur
 Kokand – Khanate of Kokand
Kombo – Kingdom of Kombo
Kong – Kong Empire
 Kongo – Kingdom of Kongo
Konta – Kingdom of Konta
Kooki – Kingdom of Kooki
Kota – Kota State
Koya – Kingdom of Koya
Kuba – Kuba Kingdom
Kumaon – Kumaon Kingdom
Kunduz
Kutai Kartanegara – Kutai Kartanegara Sultanate
Kwararafa

L
La Dombe – Sultanate of La Dombe
Ladakh
Lahej – Sultanate of Lahej
Lalangina – Lalangina Kingdom
Lalitpur – Lalitpur Kingdom
Las Bela
Loango – Kingdom of Loango
Lower Yafa – Sultanate of Lower Yafa
 Luang Phrabang – Kingdom of Luang Phrabang
Luba – Kingdom of Luba
 Lucca – Republic of Lucca
Lunda – Kingdom of Lunda
Luuka
Luwu – Kingdom of Luwu

M
 Maguindanao – Sultanate of Maguindanao
 Mahra – Mahra State of Qishn and Socotra
 Majeerteen – Majeerteen Sultanate
Makawanpur
Makran
Maku – Maku Khanate
Mandara – Mandara Kingdom
Manfuha – Manfuha Sheikhdom
 Manipur – Kingdom of Manipur
Mankessim – Mankessim Kingdom
Maore – Sultanate of Maore
Maragheh – Maragheh Khanate
Marand – Marand Khanate
 Maratha Empire
Maravi – Kingdom of Maravi
Marwar – Kingdom of Marwar
 Massa and Carrara – Duchy of Massa and Carrara
 Masserano – Principality of Masserano
 Mataram – Sultanate of Mataram
Maymana – Khanate of Maymana
Mbaku – Sultanate of Mbaku
Mbude – Sultanate of Mbude
Mbunda – Mbunda Kingdom
Mekhtuli – Khanate of Mekhtuli
Meliau – Sultanate of Meliau
Menabe – Menabe Kingdom
 Mingrelia – Principality of Mingrelia
 Misl – Sikh Confederacy
Mitsamihuli – Sultanate of Mitsamihuli
 Modena and Reggio – Duchy of Modena and Reggio
 Monaco – Principality of Monaco
 Montenegro – Prince-Bishopric of Montenegro
 Morocco – Sultanate of Morocco
Mpororo – Kingdom of Mpororo
Mrauk U – Kingdom of Mrauk U
Muang Phuan – Principality of Phuan
 Mughal Empire
Mukalla
 Muscat – Sultanate of Muscat
Mutapa – Kingdom of Mutapa
Mysore – Kingdom of Mysore

N
Nakhchivan – Nakhchivan Khanate
 Naples – Kingdom of Naples
Nawanagar – Nawanagar State
Ndzuwani – Sultanate of Ndzuwani
Nembe – Nembe Kingdom
 Netherlands – Republic of the Seven United Netherlands
Ngoyo – Kingdom of Ngoyo
Niue – Kingdom of Niue-Fekai
Niumi – Kingdom of Niumi
 Noli – Republic of Noli
Nri – Kingdom of Nri
Nungu – Nungu Kingdom

O
Òkè-Ìlá Òràngún
Okrika – Okrika Kingdom
 Oman – Imamate of Oman
Ondo – Ondo Kingdom
Onitsha – Kingdom of Onitsha
Orungu – Kingdom of Orungu
Osogbo – Osogbo Kingdom
Ossetia
 Ottoman Empire – Sublime Ottoman State
Oudh – Kingdom of Oudh
Oyo – Oyo Empire

P
 Pagaruyung – Pagaruyung Kingdom
Palembang – Sultanate of Palembang
 Papal States – State of the Church
Papekat – Sultanate of Papekat
Pasir – Sultanate of Pasir
Pate – Pate Sultanate
 Perak – Perak Sultanate
 Persia (Afsharid dynasty) – Afsharid Empire
 Persia (Zand dynasty) – Zand Empire 
 Poland–Lithuania – Polish–Lithuanian Commonwealth
Porto-Novo – Kingdom of Porto-Novo
 Portugal – Kingdom of Portugal and the Algarves
 Prussia – Kingdom of Prussia

Q
Quba – Quba Khanate

R
 Ragusa – Republic of Ragusa
Ramnad – Kingdom of Ramnad
Rapa Nui – Kingdom of Rapa Nui
Rohilkhand
Rozvi – Rozvi Empire
 Russia – Russian Empire
Rwanda – Kingdom of Rwanda
Ryukyu – Ryukyu Kingdom

S
Saloum – Kingdom of Saloum
Sambas – Sultanate of Sambas
 San Marino – Republic of San Marino
Sanwi – Kingdom of Sanwi
Sarab – Sarab Khanate
 Sardinia – Kingdom of Sardinia
Selangor – Selangor Sultanate
 Senarica – Republic of Senarica
Sennar – Funj Sultanate of Sennar
Shaib – Sheikhdom of Shaib
Shaki – Shaki Khanate
 Sharjah – Emirate of Sharjah
Sheka – Sheka Kingdom
Shihr
Shilluk – Shilluk Kingdom
Shirvan – Shirvan Khanate
Siak – Sultanate of Siak Sri Indrapura
 Sicily – Kingdom of Sicily
Sikkim – Kingdom of Sikkim
 Sindh – Sindh State
Sine – Kingdom of Sine
Sintang
Sivaganga – Kingdom of Sivaganga
 Spain – Kingdom of Spain
Subeihi – Subeihi Sultanate
Suket – Suket State
 Sulu – Sultanate of Sulu
 Surakarta – Surakarta Sunanate
Surat – Surat State
Swaziland – Kingdom of Swaziland
 Sweden – Kingdom of Sweden
 Switzerland – Swiss Confederacy

T
Tabasaran – Principality of Tabasaran
Tabriz – Tabriz Khanate
 Tadjourah – Tadjourah Sultanate
Tagant – Emirate of Tagant
Talysh – Talysh Khanate
 Tamatave – Tamatave Kingdom
Tambora – Sultanate of Tambora
Tananarive – Tananarive Kingdom
Tarki – Shamkhalate of Tarki
Tenkodogo
Terengganu – Terengganu Sultanate
Tidore – Sultanate of Tidore
Tonga – Tu'i Tonga Empire
 Torriglia – Marquisate of Torriglia
Trarza – Emirate of Trarza
 Travancore – Kingdom of Travancore
Twipra – Twipra Kingdom

U
Udaipur – Kingdom of Udaipur
Unyanyembe
Upper Yafa – Sheikhdom of Upper Yafa
Urmia – Urmia Khanate
Uvea – Kingdom of Uvea

V
 Venice – Republic of Venice
 Vientiane – Kingdom of Vientiane

W
Waalo – Kingdom of Waalo
Wadai – Sultanate of Wadai
Wahidi – Wahidi Sultanate
Wanga – Kingdom of Wanga
Warri – Kingdom of Warri
Warsangali – Warsangali Sultanate
Washili – Sultanate of Washili
Welayta – Kingdom of Welayta
Wogodogo – Kingdom of Wogodogo

Y
Yauri – Yauri Emirate

Z
Zamfara – Zamfara Kingdom
Zanjan – Zanjan Khanate
Zazzau – Zazzau Kingdom

States claiming sovereignty
 Couto Misto

References